The Zacatecos (or Zacatecas) is the name of an indigenous group, one of the peoples called Chichimecas by the Aztecs. They lived in most of what is now the state of Zacatecas and the northeastern part of Durango. They have many direct descendants, but most of their culture and traditions have disappeared with time. Large concentrations of modern-day descendants may reside in Zacatecas and Durango, as well as other large cities of Mexico.

Name 
"Zacateco" is a Mexican Spanish derivation from the original Nahuatl Zacatecatl, pluralized in early Mexican Spanish as Zacatecas, the name given to the state and city.  The name was given by the Aztecs to the people inhabiting a region in which a grass they called the zacatl was abundant.  The region was thus called Zacatlan by the Aztecs. (Mexica)

History 
The Zacateco united militarily with other Chichimeca nations to form the Chichimeca Confederation to defeat the Spaniards during the Chichimeca War (1550-90). See Chichimeca War.

The Chichimeca War

Geography 
To the east and north they overlapped lands with the Guachichiles. They extended to border the Tepehuanes to the west near Durango. To the north their land bordered that of the Irritilas or Laguna tribes, up to were Cuencamé and Parras are located. Their principal population centers were in Malpaís, around Peñón Blanco, and around the Cerro de la Bufa. They also extended down to what is now Los Altos Jalisco and overlapped territory with the Caxcanes.

Culture

Way of Life  
Most Zacatecos were nomadic, although a few groups were essentially sedentary. Both men and women wore their hair down to their waist. Some Chichimeca tribes wore their head braided, but it is unspecified if any Zacatec tribes did so. They used body paint and tattoos to distinguish themselves from other tribes. Zacatecos were known to wear skin coverings below their knees and skin headbands on their foreheads. Occasionally they wore leather-soled sandals. They were "graceful, strong, robust and beardless". Juan Bautista de Pomar commented, "In the opinion of men experienced in foreign lands, the Zacatecos are the best archers in the world."

Religion 
The Zacatecos were a nomadic tribe and others were sedentary which means they lived in one area. Some tribes did in fact have temples dedicated to some kind of worship in the southwestern part of the state of Zacatecas. In a town called El Teul Gonzalez De Ortega there is a hill called El Cerro del Sombrero. And upon this hill there are temples ball courts and also ancient channels where the tribe extracted fresh water from the hill.

Conclusion 
The Zacatecos as a culture have vanished or faded, due to assimilation and mestizaje of the Mexican people. However, many of their direct descendants still live in large concentrations in central Mexico. Taking all this into account, it is extremely difficult to even approximate the population of their descendants. It is equally hard to elaborate on their  culture, language, art, and traditions.

References 
Powell, Philip Wayne. Soldiers, Indians, & Silver: The Northward Advance of New Spain, 1550-1600. Berkeley, California: University of California Press, 1969.

Indigenous peoples of Aridoamerica
Indigenous peoples in Mexico
Durango
Zacatecas